Slochd Crossing railway station served the railwaymen and families that worked or lived near the Slochd level Crossing in Duthil, historically in Inverness-shire, Scotland, from 1922 to 1935 on the Inverness and Aviemore Direct Railway.

History
The station was opened in 1922 by the Highland Railway. It didn't appear in the timetable as it was privately used. It closed in 1935.

References

Disused railway stations in Highland (council area)
Former Highland Railway stations
Railway stations in Great Britain opened in 1922
Railway stations in Great Britain closed in 1935
1922 establishments in Scotland
1935 disestablishments in Scotland